The Jatoi are a Baloch tribe of Pakistan.

The Jatoi are among the main tribes in the Kacchi Plain in the east of Balochistan. There are also communities in Sindh (specifically in the districts of Shikarpur, Nosheroferoz, Dadu, Larkana, Khairpur Mirs, Sukkur and Jacobabad), and in Punjab (in Muzzafargarh, Jhang, Rahimyar Khan, and Dera Ghazi Khan districts).

Balochi traditional ballads tell of a leader named Mir Jalal Khan who had four sons, Rind, Lashar, Hot, and Korai, and a daughter Jato, who married his nephew Morad. These five are, according to these ballads, the eponymous founders of the five tribes of the Rinds, Lasharis, Hooths, Korais, and Jatois.

Language 
Members of the tribe mostly have either Seraiki and Sindhi as their first language, although speakers of Balochi are also to be found, Jatois living in faisalabad disctrict speak Punjabi, though the Jatoi tribal leader Rustam Khan Jatoi who was a general in Humayoun's army buried in Dehli so jatois living in Dehli speak hindi.

Subclans 
The subclans of the  Jatoi are Aterani,  Shar .Nachrani, Perozani, Jafrani, Bullani, Lahorzai, Bullo, Misrani, Kharoos, Zangeja, Kosh, Baghani, Tarrt, Shadinja, Birhamani and Jatoi).

References
2.Khan Bakhtawar Jatoiya(subclan ot Jatoi tribr)

3.Sheer M Johiya(Jatoiya subclan leader) after joining in Jatoi tribe during migration from India.￼
Social groups of Pakistan
Sindhi tribes
Baloch tribes
Saraiki tribes
Brahui tribes